Bishnupur is a rural municipality in Saptari District in the Sagarmatha Zone of south-eastern Nepal. At the time of the 2017 Nepal census it had a population of 23,035 people living in 6554 individual households.

References 

Rural municipalities in Saptari District
 Populated places in Saptari District
Rural municipalities of Nepal established in 2017
Rural municipalities in Madhesh Province